Midway North is a census-designated place (CDP) in Hidalgo County, Texas. The population was 4,752 at the 2010 United States Census. It is part of the McAllen–Edinburg–Mission Metropolitan Statistical Area.

Geography
Midway North is located at  (26.185737, -98.016852).

Demographics
As of the census of 2000, there were 3,946 people, 834 households, and 783 families residing in the CDP. The population density was 1,908.7 people per square mile (736.0/km2). There were 902 housing units at an average density of 436.3/sq mi (168.2/km2). The racial makeup of the CDP was 88.70% White, 0.15% African American, 0.18% Native American, 9.96% from other races, and 1.01% from two or more races. Hispanic or Latino of any race were 98.96% of the population.

There were 834 households, out of which 68.6% had children under the age of 18 living with them, 77.6% were married couples living together, 13.2% had a female householder with no husband present, and 6.0% were non-families. 4.2% of all households were made up of individuals, and 1.4% had someone living alone who was 65 years of age or older. The average household size was 4.73 and the average family size was 4.88.

In the CDP, the population was spread out, with 42.8% under the age of 18, 13.9% from 18 to 24, 27.3% from 25 to 44, 12.3% from 45 to 64, and 3.7% who were 65 years of age or older. The median age was 21 years. For every 100 females, there were 101.6 males. For every 100 females age 18 and over, there were 98.1 males.

The median income for a household in the CDP was $21,849, and the median income for a family was $22,529. Males had a median income of $17,028 versus $12,162 for females. The per capita income for the CDP was $5,202. About 43.4% of families and 43.9% of the population were below the poverty line, including 50.4% of those under age 18 and 49.0% of those age 65 or over.

Education
Much of Midway North (sections east of Midway Road) is served by the Weslaco Independent School District. Two elementary schools, Cleckler-Heald Elementary School and "Rudy" Silva Elementary School, serve sections of the WISD portion. All residents are zoned to Beatriz Garza Middle School, and Weslaco High School.

A portion of Midway North (sections west of Midway Road) is served by the Donna Independent School District (DISD). Residents are zoned to Price Elementary School, Todd Middle School, and Donna High School.

In addition, South Texas Independent School District operates magnet schools that serve the community.

References

Census-designated places in Hidalgo County, Texas
Census-designated places in Texas